Lingling-o or ling-ling-o, is a type of penannular or double-headed pendant or amulet that has been associated with various late Neolithic to late Iron Age Austronesian cultures. Most lingling-o were made in jade workshops in the Philippines, and to a lesser extent in the Sa Huỳnh culture of Vietnam, although the raw jade was mostly sourced from Taiwan.

The earliest surviving examples of lingling-o, dating back to around 500 BC, were made out of nephrite jade, but many later examples were made of shell, gold, copper, and wood; the kind of material suggests differences in the social standing of its wearer.  The term was first popularized by H. Otley Beyer, who adapted it from the Southern Ifugao name for such ornaments.  The term has since also come to be used as a blanket term for various metal age Austronesian ornaments found in the Philippines, Taiwan, and Vietnam.

Although the earliest known lingling-o dates from 500 BC, the art of jade carving and its trade in the region is much older. In 2000 BC, the Maritime Jade Road was established by the animist indigenous peoples of Taiwan and the Philippines. This expansive trade network included other commodities as well, and later expanded to include Vietnam, Malaysia, Brunei, Singapore, Thailand, Indonesia, and Cambodia. The maritime jade road is one of the most extensive sea-based trade networks of a single geological material in the prehistoric world. It was in existence for at least 3,000 years, where its peak production was from 2000 BCE to 500 CE, older than the Silk Road in mainland Eurasia. It began to wane during its final centuries from 500 CE until 1000 CE. The entire period of the network was a golden age for the diverse animist societies of the region.

Batanes workshop site
Earlier historians have posited that the earliest lingling-o artifacts found in the Philippines were created outside of the archipelago, but an expedition to the northern Philippine province of Batanes, led by archeologist Peter Bellwood in the early 2000s, led to the discovery of a lingling-o workshop, complete with construction tools and fragments.  The find provides evidence of indigenous Philippine manufacture of lingling-o as early as 2,500 years ago. Lingling-o manufacturing survived until around AD 1000 in the Philippines.

See also
Hongshan culture 
Sa Huynh-Kalanay Interaction Sphere
Hei-tiki
Hei matau
Manaia
Maritime Jade Road
Pounamu
Magatama: similar pendants from ancient Japan
Gogok: similar pendants from the ancient Korean Peninsula
Pig dragon or zhūlóng: zoomorphic stone artifacts produced in neolithic China with a similar c- or comma-like shape.
Ifugao people
H. Otley Beyer
Peter Bellwood

References 

 
History of the Philippines (900–1565)
Prehistory of the Philippines
Archaeology of the Philippines
Ancient Asia